Jean-Marc Rives is a French singer (lyric tenor), musician, painter, poet, philosopher and writer. He is son of French father and French mother of Italian origin. He was born 16 November 1950, in Rabat. He is known for his paintings, concerts, records and literary works. He is also known for saxophone and Music Instruments. His work of art is constituted from over 500 paintings, all figurative and modern. Jean-Marc Rives was named Academician at the Greci-Marino International Academy in 1997 and elected Knight in 1999. He also obtained the Excellence Prize in the Grand Prix International des Seigneurs de l'Art in 1997.

Biography

The 1960s
Jean-Marc Rives was interested in poetry since his early childhood. At age 7, he declaimed his poems on Radio Maroc and at around 12 he was inclined to painting. At age 17, he entered the Conservatoire National de Rabat where he studied dramatic art and lyric singing. Meanwhile, he continued to learn guitar and played in churches. He graduated from high school in major philosophy in year 1968. Jean began to start living from small jobs and created a band called Les Copains where he himself was singer. He directed several short and mid-long Westerns and one thriller that were later shown in theaters.

The 1970s
At age 20, to free himself from his military obligations, he volunteered in the French army 42nd Infantry Meca, Wittlich Germany, where he became singer and musician for the regiment orchestra. He refuses to follow the platoon of Officers but obtains the Distinction of Private 1st Class. After his release in 1971, he continued his career as a singer in France, in Lucien Attard's orchestra, but he also worked as an operator in the Argenteuil cinema complex directed by Alain Condroyer of the UGC group from 1972 to 1974 where he screened his film "Grabuge au soleil. In year 1974 he became a graduate drawer.

In 1975, already the father of two children, including a little girl from his partner's first marriage, he entered the Electrical and Gas Industries and married on September 25, 1976, in Saint-Ouen-l'Aumône. He continued to play in various galas around France and he recorded several covers of Michel Sardou and Johnny Hallyday with the great orchestra of Claude Dauray from 1975 to 1978.

The 1980s
In 1980 he moved to a town called Osny (Val d'Oise, France) and the light of this region was his continuous inspiration for his painting. In 1983 he began a solo career and recorded an EP including two songs Cœur Gros and Liberté.

The 1990s
In the early 1990s Jean's real career was begun as an international painter. He started to exhibit all around the world. In 1994, his work was acknowledged during an auction in profit of Osny's handicapped children charity. In 1995, the Centre Européen d'Art bought one of his paintings. The same year, after going back to studies, he graduated as a commercial agent.
In 1996, some galleries in France and abroad became more and more interested in his paintings. The same year, he published his first book. In 1997, he was awarded several times and his work was acknowledged. In 1999, he received the Medal of Honor given by the French government.

The 2000s
In 2002, he received another medal from the French government dedicated to artists. In 2007 he published a didactic book made of 20 lessons about drawing. In 2009, he published a poetry book and one year later a book of short stories. In 2012, Jean Marc Rives published his second novel. This one is based on historic, esoteric and some real facts. During his writing, he continued to exhibit his work all around the world. In 2013, he received another medal for Dedication, Altruism and Humanitarian Acts. In 2015, Jean Marc Rives published a Philosophical treatise, In 2017 his autobiography on his artistic career and an Art book, In 2020 he published his third novel.

Paintings
Jean Marc Rives has painted over 500 art pieces.  Some are exhibited in museums; and others are now part of private collections.

Some of his recent paintings are
Maisons provençales −2013
Village du Sud −2008
Composition Florale – 2008
Eglise de Vetheuil – 2008
Pavillon Chinois −2008
Charme de Giverny −2008
Bouquet au vase bleu −2008
Jardins de Giverny −2008
Côte d'Armor −2009
Pont du Cabouillet −2008
Nesle-La-Vallée −2008
La Roche Guyon −2008
Bouquet de Marguerites – 2008
La Frette sur Seine −2008
Arbres en fleurs −2008

Exhibitions
Jean-Marc Rives has participated in following exhibitions
2022 : Personal exhibition Galerie de L'ÉVEIL NORMAND – BERNAY (Eure) 
2018 : Exhibition – Espace Culturel SAINT-BENOIT – SAINT-JAMES (Manche) 
2017 : Personal exhibition – VENDÔME (Loir-et-Cher)
2016 : Personal exhibition Galerie de L'ÉVEIL NORMAND – BERNAY (Eure) 
2015 : Personal exhibition "AU FIL DE L'ART" – Salle Georges Pompidou – MARINES (Val d'Oise) 
2010 : Personal exhibition "C'EST MA TERRE" – Mairie de SANTEUIL (Val d'Oise)
2009 : HOSTELLERIE DU MAUPERTU – 25 Route d'Auvers – PONTOISE (Val d'Oise)
2008 : Galerie CURIOSITE & GOURMANDISE – 8 Grande Rue – VETHEUIL (Val d'Oise)
2008 :GRAND-PAPA – ANTIQUAIRE – 1 / 3 Grande Rue – VETHEUIL (Val d'Oise)
2007 : ART EVENT Grand Salon Contemporain Abtewerp Expo ANVERS (Belgique)
2007 : HÔTEL RITZ Salons d'été Place Vendôme – PARIS
2007 : LONDON ART WALDORF PALACE Salon Adelphi LONDRES (Angleterre)
2007 : Salon de la Rotonde of the Lausanne Palace, Lausanne (Switzerland)
2006 : Personal exhibition "NUANCES" – Mairie de SAINT-PRIX (Val d'Oise)
2006 : Personal exhibition "PARCOURS EN VEXIN ET EN PROVENCE" – L'ISLE-ADAM (Val d'Oise)
2005 : Personal exhibition "NATURE ET PAYSAGES" – Hôtel de Ville – PARMAIN (Val d'Oise)
2003 : Personal exhibition Galerie de L'ÉVEIL NORMAND – BERNAY (Eure) 
2000 : Galerie "Au Rendez-vous des Amis" à MONTMARTRE – PARIS 18ème
2000 : Hommage at the Espace Culturel "PYRAMEDIAS" à MOISSELLE-DOMONT (Val d'Oise)
1999 : Galerie Thuillier – PARIS 3ème
1999 : Espace Culturel "PYRAMEDIAS" à MOISSELLE-DOMONT (Val d'Oise)
1999 : Salle de l'AGORA à CERGY VAUREAL (Val d'Oise)
1999 : Galerie ARTCOUR Georges DARVILL – Faubourg Saint-Honoré – PARIS 8ème
1998 : Galerie European Art Group à SAINTE-MAXIME (Var)
1998 : Grand Prix "La Cote des Arts" à MARSEILLE (Bouches-du-Rhône)
1998 : Grand Gala National au Château de GOULAINE (Haute-Loire)
1998 : Salon "Les Médiévales" à ARCS-SUR-ARGENS (Var)
1998 : Galerie François Delaporte à VILLE D'AVRAY (Hauts-de-Seine)
1997 : Grand Prix International de GRASSE (Alpes-Maritimes)
1997 : Grand Prix International de NICE (Alpes-Maritimes)
1997 : Grand Prix International des "Seigneurs de l'Art" à AIX-EN-PROVENCE (Bouches-du-Rhône)
1997 : Salon ACEA de BARCELONE (Espagne)
1997 : Académie saint-Vincent à JOUY-LE-MOUTIER (Val d'Oise)
1997 : Espace Carpeaux – PARIS LA DEFENSE (Hauts-de-Seine)
1997 : Galerie François Delaporte à VILLE D'AVRAY (Hauts-de-Seine)
1997 : Guest of Honor at LONDINIERES (Seine-Maritime)
1997 : Personal exhibition – Hôtel de Ville – COURDIMANCHE (Val d'Oise)
1997 : Personal exhibition – Hôtel de Ville – PARMAIN (Val d'Oise)
1996 : Musée de la Marine – Palais de Chaillot – PARIS 16ème
1996 : Salon des Indépendants – Espace Eiffel-Branly – PARIS
1996 : Salon d'Hiver – Galerie de Nesle – PARIS 9ème
1996 : Guest of Honor at CLERMONT-FERRAND (Puy-de-Dôme)
1996 : Personal exhibition à RY (Seine-Maritime)
1996 : Guest of Honor at DIJON (Côte d'Or)
1996 : Salon International de BARCELONE (Espagne)
1996 : Château de Grouchy à OSNY (Val d'Oise)
1995 : Salons de Printemps au CENTRE EUROPEEN D'ART – Avenue Victor Hugo PARIS 16ème
1995 : Salons d'Eté au CENTRE EUROPEEN D'ART – Avenue Victor Hugo – PARIS 16ème
1995 : Foire de Paris
1995 : Château de Grouchy à OSNY (Val d'Oise)
1995 : Maison de Gérard Philippe à CERGY (Val d'Oise)
1995 : Château de LA ROCHE GUYON (Val d'Oise)

Bibliography
2020 : LE GRAND AMOUR DE LAWRENCE – Novel – Published by Edilivre-Aparis  
2017 : REGARD SUR L'ART Chroniques et Portraits d'Artistes – Published by Editions du Net 
2017 : AU DÉTOUR DU DESTIN À cœur ouvert – Autobiography – Published by Edilivre-Aparis   
2015 : L'ART ET SON ALCHIMIE – Philosophical treatise – Published by Edilivre-Aparis 
2012 : LES POUVOIRS DU CRÂNE DE CRISTAL – Novel – Published by Edilivre-Aparis
2010 : DRÔLES DE DAMES – Short Stories – Published by Le Manuscrit
2008 : MEMOIRE DU TEMPS – Poetry – Published by Le Manuscrit
2007 : LES SECRETS DU DESSIN ET DE LA PEINTURE – Didactic book – Published by Le Manuscrit
1996 : LES MYSTERES DU SPHINX – Novel – Published by Nouvelles Pléiade

Records collections
1983 : Liberté – (C. Macé – J. M. Rives – J. Nilovic) – EP – Disques Vygson
1983 : Cœur Gros – (C. Macé – J. M. Rives – J. Nilovic) – EP – Disques Vygson
1978 : Je vole – (M. Sardou – P. Billon) – EP – Disques Vygson
1978 : En Chantant (T. Cutugno – M. Sardou – P. Delanoë) – LP
1977 : La Java de Broadway- (J. Revaux – M. Sardou – P. Delanoë)-EP – Disques Vygson
1977 : Dix ans plus tôt- (J. Revaux – M. Sardou – P. Billon)
EP – Disques Vygson
1977 : J'accuse- (J. Revaux – M. Sardou – P. Delanoë) EP – Disques Vygson
1976 : La Vieille (J. Revaux – M. Sardou – G. Thibault) – EP – Disques Vygson
1976 : Je vais t'aimer- (J. Revaux – M. Sardou – G. Thibault) – EP – Disques Vygson
1976 : Requiem pour un fou- (G. Thibault – Johnny Hallyday – G. Layani) – EP- Disques Vygson
1975 : Le France – (J. Revaux – M. Sardou – P. Delanoë) – EP – Disques Vygson
1975 : Un Accident (J. Revaux – M. Sardou) – EP – Disques Vygson

Awards
Jean-Marc Rives has been awarded with following awards
2013 : Silver Medal for Dedication, Altruism and Humanitarian Acts
2002 : Bronze Medal given by Arts et Lettres de France
2000 : Silver Medal given by Poètes et Artistes Français – Poets without boardes
1999 : Chevalier de l'Académie Internationale GRECI-MARINO
1999 : Gold Medal for the Mérite et Dévouement Français
1999 : Honor Diploma given by the ROTARY-CLUB de CHALONS SAINT-VINCENT
1998 : Title of distinguished poet given by the Bibliothèque Internationale de Poésie d'EVREUX
1998 : Public award for the Exhibition "LES MEDIEVALES" à ARCS-SUR-ARGENS
1998 : Jury Price at the Grand Prix International "L'AIGLE DE NICE"
1998 : Finalist of the "AUTOPORTRAIT" contest in MARSEILLE
1997 : Academician of the international Academy GRECI-MARINO
1997 : Honor Price at Grand Prix International "SEIGNEURS DE L'ART" in AIX-EN-PROVENCE
1996 : Distinction for his poetry book by la Société des Poètes et Artistes de France

References

1950 births
Living people
Writers from Rabat
French male singers
French poets
French male poets